Antonello is an Italian masculine given name as well as a nickname and surname that is a variant of Antonio. Notable people with this name include the following:

Given name
 Antonello Bacciocchi (1957-2007), Sammarinese politician
 Antonello Bonci (born 1966), Italian neurologist
 Antonello Crescenzio, the son of Antonio Crescenzio, (born early 16th century), Italian sculptor and painter
 Antonello Cuccureddu (born 1949), Italian footballer
 Antonello da Caserta (fl 14th and 15th century), Italian composer
 Antonello da Messina (c. 1430 – 1479), Italian painter
 Antonello de Folgore (died 1590), Italian Roman Catholic bishop
 Antonello Eustachi (died 1544), Italian Roman Catholic bishop
 Antonello Fassari (born 1952), Italian actor and comedian
 Antonello Gagini (1478–1536), Italian sculptor
 Antonello Manacorda (born 1970), Italian violinist and conductor
 Antonello Matarazzo (born 1962), Italian artist
 Antonello Padovano (born 1955), Italian film director and producer
 Antonello Palombi (born 1968), Italian operatic tenor
 Antonello Joseph Sarte Perez, known as AJ Perez (1993 – 2011), Filipino actor
 Antonello Petrucci (died 1487), Italian nobleman
 Antonello Riccio (active 1576), Italian painter
 Antonello Riva (born 1962), Italian basketball player
 Antonello Savelli (c. 1450 – 1498), Italian condottiero
 Antonello Silverini (born 1966), Italian illustrator
 Antonello Tabacco (born 1990), Italian footballer
 Antonello Trombadori (1917 – 1993), Italian politician
 Antonello Zappadu (born 1957), Italian photo reporter

Nickname
 Antonello Grimaldi nickname of Antonio Luigi Grimaldi (born 1955), Italian actor, director, and screenwriter
 Antonello Soro (born Antonio Giuseppe Soro, 1948), Italian politician
 Antonello Venditti, nickname of Antonio Venditti (born 1949), Italian singer-songwriter
 Antonello Carozza, nickname of Antonio Carozza, (born 1985), Italian singer, songwriter, composer, art director

Surname
 Bill Antonello (1927 – 1993), American baseball player
 Brent Antonello (born 1989), American actor
 Juliano Roberto Antonello, known as Juca (footballer, born 1979), (born 1979), Brazilian footballer

See also

Antonella
Antonelli

References

Italian masculine given names